Yulia, Julia, or Yuliya Ivanova may refer to:

 Yuliya Ivanova (cross-country skier) (born 1985), Russian cross-country skier
 Yulia Ivanova (model) (born 1983), Russian beauty queen and model
 Yuliya Ivanova (rhythmic gymnast) (born 1977), Russian rhythmic gymnast
 Yuliya Zaripova (born 1986), née Ivanova, Russian middle-distance runner